Delaney Lyn Spaulding (born May 9, 1995) is an American, former collegiate All-American, medal-winning Olympian, softball shortstop. Spaulding played college softball for the UCLA Bruins in the Pac-12 Conference from 2014 to 2017. She represented the United States at the 2020 Summer Olympics and won a silver medal.

Career
Spaulding has been named a Second Team and three-time First Team All-Pac-12 player. She was also chosen twice as a National Fastpitch Coaches Association Second Team All-American.

Personal life
Delaney has a sister who also played college softball at North Carolina, Danielle Spaulding.

International career
Delaney has played for Team USA since 2016 and competed at the 2020 Summer Olympics and won a silver medal. During the tournament, she recorded a double and four walks for the team. During the gold medal game against Team Japan, Spaulding recorded one walk in a 2–0 loss.

Statistics

References

External links
 

1995 births
Living people
UCLA Bruins softball players
Softball players from California
Olympic softball players of the United States
People from Rancho Cucamonga, California
Pan American Games medalists in softball
Pan American Games gold medalists for the United States
Softball players at the 2019 Pan American Games
Medalists at the 2019 Pan American Games
Softball players at the 2020 Summer Olympics
Medalists at the 2020 Summer Olympics
Olympic silver medalists for the United States in softball
Olympic medalists in softball